Rutgers University Press (RUP) is a nonprofit academic publishing house, operating in New Brunswick, New Jersey under the auspices of Rutgers University.

History 
Rutgers University Press, a nonprofit academic publishing house operating in New Brunswick, New Jersey, under the auspices of
Rutgers University, was founded on March 26, 1936. Since then, the press has grown in size and the scope of its publishing program. Among the original areas of specialization were Civil War history and European history. The press’ current areas of specialization include sociology, anthropology, health policy, history of medicine, human rights, urban studies, Jewish studies, American studies, film and media studies, the environment, and books about New Jersey and the mid–Atlantic region. The press consists of a small team of 18 full-time staff members.

Publishing partnerships 
In 2018, Rutgers University Press entered into a partnership with Bucknell University Press.

In 2021, Rutgers University Press entered into a partnership with University of Delaware Press.

Open access 
Rutgers is one of thirteen publishers to participate in the Knowledge Unlatched pilot, a global library consortium approach to funding open access books.

Notable series 
Rutgers University Press has more than eighty series of books, both past and current. This is a list of notable series by the press.

The American Campus 
Edited by Harold S. Wechsler.

The books in this series explore recent developments and public policy issues in higher education in the United States. Topics include access to college and affordability; drop-out rates; tenure and academic freedom; campus labor; the expansion of administrative posts and salaries; the crisis in the humanities and the arts; the corporate university and for-profit colleges; online education; controversy in sports programs; and gender, ethnic, racial, religious, and class dynamics and diversity. Books feature scholarship from a variety of disciplines in the humanities and social sciences.

Comics Culture 
Edited by Corey K. Creekmur, Craig Fischer, Jeet Heer, and Ana Merino.

Volumes in the Comics Culture series explore the artistic, historical, social, and cultural significance of newspaper comic strips, comic books, and graphic novels, with individual titles devoted to focused studies of key titles, characters, writers, and artists throughout the history of comics; additional books in the series address major themes or topics in comics studies, including prominent genres, national traditions, and significant historical and theoretical issues.

Global Media & Race 
Edited by Frederick Luis Aldama.

Books in this series consider how race—and intersectional identities generally—is constructed in front of the camera and behind, attending to issues of representation and consumption as well as the making of racialized and anti-racist media phenomena from script to production and policy. It utilizes a comparative and interdisciplinary approach to media and race.

Key Words in Jewish Studies 
Edited by Deborah Dash Moore, MacDonald Moore, and Andrew Bush.

Key Words in Jewish Studies is a series of books that provide clear and judiciously illustrated accounts of terms currently in use and to chart histories of past usage. Far from consolidating and narrowing a critical lexicon, deciphering key words stimulates discussion about the boundaries of Jewish studies, its relationship to other forms of cultural studies, and the position of Jewish studies in the larger sphere of culture. With this series we open a new and exciting chapter in Jewish studies for the 21st century.

Nature, Society, and Culture 
Edited by Scott Frickel.

This series provides a platform for showcasing the best of scholarship on nature-society-culture interactions, and features carefully crafted empirical studies of socio-environmental change and the effects such change has on ecosystems, social institutions, historical processes and cultural practices. Anchored in sociological analyses of the environment, the series is home to studies that employ a range of disciplinary and interdisciplinary perspectives to investigate the pressing socio-environmental questions of our time–from environmental inequality and risk, to the science and politics of climate change and serial disaster, to the environmental causes and consequences of urbanization and war-making, and beyond.

See also

 List of English-language book publishing companies
 List of university presses

References

External links
 

 
Press
Book publishing companies based in New Jersey
Publishing companies established in 1936
University presses of the United States
Companies based in New Brunswick, New Jersey